Christiane Fernande Boursaud (1918–1992) was a French stage and film actress.

Filmography

References

Bibliography
 Cowie, Peter. International Film Guide: 1973. Tantivy Press, 1973.

External links

1918 births
1992 deaths
French film actresses
French stage actresses
Actresses from Paris
20th-century French actresses